Die helle Nacht (The Bright Night) is a 1935 opera by Richard Flury to  1912 verse play of the same name.

Recording
 Die helle Nacht – Julia Sophie Wagner, Stephanie Bühlmann, Magnus Vigilius, Eric Stoklosa, Göttinger Symphonie Orchester, Paul Mann. CD Toccata 2021

References

1935 operas
German-language operas
Operas